The 2014–15 Dynamo Kyiv season is Dynamo's 25th Ukrainian Premier League season, and their second season under manager Serhii Rebrov. During the season, Dynamo will compete in the Ukrainian Premier League, Ukrainian Cup and in the UEFA Champions League.

Squad

Out on loan

Retired number(s)

12 –  Club Supporters (the 12th Man)

Transfers

Summer

In:

Out:

Winter

In:

Out:

Competitions

Ukrainian Super Cup

Ukrainian Premier League

League table

Results summary

Results by round

Results

Ukrainian Cup

Champions League

Group stage

Knockout stage

Squad statistics

Appearances and goals

|-
|colspan="14"|Players who left Dynamo Kyiv on loan during the season :

|-
|colspan="14"|Players who left Dynamo Kyiv during the season :

|}

Goalscorers

Disciplinary record

Notes
Notes

References

External links
Official website

Dynamo Kyiv
FC Dynamo Kyiv seasons
Dynamo Kyiv
Ukrainian football championship-winning seasons